Northgate is a census-designated place (CDP) in Hamilton County, Ohio, United States. The population was 7,277 at the 2020 census.

Northgate Mall serves as a shopping hub for the west side of Cincinnati.

Geography
Northgate is located at  (39.258124, -84.587332).

Demographics

At the 2000 census there were 8,016 people, 2,747 households, and 2,214 families living in the CDP. The population density was 3,178.6 people per square mile (1,228.2/km). There were 2,805 housing units at an average density of 1,112.3/sq mi (429.8/km).  The racial makeup of the CDP was 86.22% White, 10.37% African American, 0.09% Native American, 1.31% Asian, 0.07% Pacific Islander, 0.64% from other races, and 1.31% from two or more races. Hispanic or Latino of any race were 1.43%.

Of the 2,747 households 39.3% had children under the age of 18 living with them, 65.4% were married couples living together, 10.8% had a female householder with no husband present, and 19.4% were non-families. 16.5% of households were one person and 7.7% were one person aged 65 or older. The average household size was 2.87 and the average family size was 3.21.

The age distribution was 27.4% under the age of 18, 8.3% from 18 to 24, 29.9% from 25 to 44, 23.1% from 45 to 64, and 11.4% 65 or older. The median age was 36 years. For every 100 females, there were 98.4 males. For every 100 females age 18 and over, there were 95.7 males.

The median household income was $52,872 and the median family income  was $60,000. Males had a median income of $38,558 versus $26,943 for females. The per capita income for the CDP was $21,799. About 2.7% of families and 3.7% of the population were below the poverty line, including 4.5% of those under age 18 and 7.3% of those age 65 or over.

References

Census-designated places in Hamilton County, Ohio
Census-designated places in Ohio